Kelp Records is a Canadian record label based in Ottawa, Ontario, Canada.  It was formed in March 1994 by Jon Bartlett in Fredericton, New Brunswick.

The record label has worked with a number of Canadian artists, including Andrew Vincent, The Acorn, Jim Bryson, HILOTRONS,  Chris Page, Flecton Big Sky, Camp Radio, Andy Swan, The Michael Parks, The Flaps, Rhume and Greenfield Main. Other former roster members include Paperjack, Nineteenseventyeight, Professor Undressor, and Traiyf.

Discography

See also 
 List of record labels

Notes

External links 
 http://kelprecords.com

Record labels established in 1994
Canadian independent record labels
Indie rock record labels
Companies based in Ottawa